Guilherme Machado Cardoso Fontes (born January 8, 1967) is a Brazilian actor and director.

Filmography

As a movie actor
 1986 - A Cor do Seu Destino .... Paulo
 1987 - Um Trem para as Estrelas ... Vinicius
 1988 - Dedé Mamata .... Dedé
 2007 - Primo Basílio .... Sebastião
As a cinema director
 2015 - Chatô, o Rei do Brasil

As a television actor

series
 1988 - O Pagador de Promessas .... Aderbal
 1990 - Desejo .... Dilermando
 2008 - Casos e Acasos .... Chico
 2009 - Tudo Novo de Novo .... Paulo
 2010 - S.O.S. Emergência .... Heitor
 2010 - As Cariocas .... Luiz Felipe
novels
 1985 - Ti Ti Ti .... Caco
 1986 - Selva de Pedra .... Júnior
 1988 - Bebê a Bordo .... Rei
 1990 - Gente Fina .... Maurício
 1993 - Mulheres de Areia .... Marcos Assunção
 1994 - A Viagem .... Alexandre Toledo
 1995 - Malhação .... Rei Star
 1996 - O Fim do Mundo .... Josias Junqueira
 1996 - O Rei do Gado .... Otávio (Tavinho)
 2001 - Estrela-Guia .... Tony Salles
 2005 - Bang Bang .... Jeff Wall Street
 2007 - Malhação .... Fernando Albuquerque (Naninho)
 2008 - Beleza Pura .... Alexandre Brito (Alex)
 2011 - Cordel Encantado .... Marquês Zenóbio Alfredo

References

External links
 

1967 births
Living people
Male actors from Petrópolis
Brazilian male film actors
Brazilian male television actors
Brazilian male telenovela actors